Garrett Hill (born January 16, 1996) is an American professional baseball pitcher for the Detroit Tigers of Major League Baseball (MLB). He made his MLB debut in 2022.

Career
Hill attended Analy High School in Sebastopol, California and played college baseball at San Diego State University. He was drafted by the Detroit Tigers in the 26th round of the 2018 Major League Baseball Draft. He made his professional debut that year with the Gulf Coast Tigers.

Hill played 2019 with the West Michigan Whitecaps and Lakeland Flying Tigers. He did not play in 2020 due to the Minor League Baseball season being cancelled because of the Covid-19 Pandemic. Hill returned in 2021 to pitch for West Michigan and the Erie SeaWolves. After the season, he played in the Arizona Fall League. Hill started the 2022 season with Erie.

Detroit Tigers
On July 3, 2022, the Tigers purchased Hill's contract and added him to the active roster. He started the first game of a doubleheader the next day, making his Major League debut against the Cleveland Guardians. Hill went six innings in this game, allowing one run on two hits while striking out three batters to earn his first MLB win. He became the first Tiger pitcher in team history to pitch at least six innings in his debut while allowing two or fewer hits.

References

External links

1996 births
Living people
People from Petaluma, California
Baseball players from California
Major League Baseball pitchers
Detroit Tigers players
San Diego State Aztecs baseball players
Gulf Coast Tigers players
Lakeland Flying Tigers players
West Michigan Whitecaps players
Erie SeaWolves players
Toledo Mud Hens players
Salt River Rafters players
Anchorage Bucs players